Shahrak-e Ashayri Hazart Mehdi (also Romanized as Shahrak-e ʿAshāyrī Ḩaz̤art Mehdī) is a village in Mahur Berenji Rural District, Sardasht District, Dezful County, Khuzestan Province, Iran. At the 2006 census, its population was 1,101, in 215 families.

References 

Populated places in Dezful County